The Promotional Framework for Occupational Safety and Health Convention, 2006 is an International Labour Organization convention concluded in 2006, which entered into force in 2009.

Content 
The Occupational Safety and Health Convention, ratified in 2006, is binding only on members whose accession has been registered by the Director-General of the International Labour Office but does not supersede international labour conventions and recommendations. The convention enters into force on any member within twelve months of the date of official registration of accession. The Director-General of the International Labour Office notifies all members of the International Labour Office of the fact of official registrations and draws the attention of the members of the organization to the date of entry into force of this convention. The Director-General of the International Labour Office shall comply with the Charter of the United Nations.

Ratifications 
As of March 2023, it has been ratified by 59 states.

References

External links
Text.
Ratifications.

Treaties concluded in 2006
Treaties entered into force in 2009
International Labour Organization conventions
Treaties of Albania
Treaties of Argentina
Treaties of Austria
Treaties of Bosnia and Herzegovina
Treaties of Burkina Faso
Treaties of Canada
Treaties of Chile
Treaties of Cuba
Treaties of Cyprus
Treaties of the Czech Republic
Treaties of Denmark
Treaties of the Dominican Republic
Treaties of Finland
Treaties of France
Treaties of Germany
Treaties of Indonesia
Treaties of Iraq
Treaties of Kazakhstan
Treaties of Japan
Treaties of North Macedonia
Treaties of Malaysia
Treaties of Mauritius
Treaties of Moldova
Treaties of Montenegro
Treaties of Niger
Treaties of Norway
Treaties of Russia
Treaties of Serbia
Treaties of Singapore
Treaties of Slovakia
Treaties of Slovenia
Treaties of South Korea
Treaties of Spain
Treaties of Sweden
Treaties of Thailand
Treaties of Togo
Treaties of Turkey
Treaties of the United Kingdom
Treaties of Vietnam
Treaties of Zambia
Occupational safety and health treaties
2006 in labor relations
Treaties of Ivory Coast